Toompea castle is a medieval castle on Toompea hill in the central part of Tallinn, the capital of Estonia. In modern times, it houses the Parliament of Estonia.

History
The Toompea castle's predecessor, an ancient Estonian stronghold had been in use since at least the 9th century AD. In 1219, the castle was taken over by Denmark's crusaders led by king Valdemar II. According to a popular Danish legend, the flag of Denmark (Dannebrog) fell from the sky during a critical stage of the battle (known as the Battle of Lindanise). This first proper castle was referred to as the "Castle of the Danes", in Latin castrum danorum and in contemporary archaic Estonian taani linna. From the latter, the modern name of the city of Tallinn is possibly derived) (see also Tallinn#Etymology).

In 1227, the castle was taken over by the Order of the Brethren of the Sword, who initiated rebuilding schemes. The castle that was started to be built in the 13th century is to a large extent the castle that can be seen today. The castle again fell to Denmark just ten years later, in 1237, but was sold to the Teutonic Order in 1346, and would remain in their hands for the remainder of the Middle Ages.

As the crusading Teutonic Order was a religious order, the castle came to resemble a monastery in several ways. It included a chapel, a chapter house and a dormitory for the knights. The order was also responsible for erecting the still visible towers of the castle, including "Pilsticker" (translated as "arrow-sharpener"), "Stür den Kerl" ("ward off the enemy"), "Landskrone" ("crown of the land"), and "Langer Hermann" (in Estonian Pikk Hermann or "Tall Hermann"). The flag of Estonia is hoisted at the top of the tower every day at sunrise, to the sound of the national anthem, and lowered at sunset.

With the upheavals of the Livonian War during the 16th century, the crusader orders formerly dominating the present-day Latvia and Estonia were dissolved and the region became contested by Sweden, Poland and Muscovy (Russia). By 1561, northern Estonia had become a Swedish dominion. The Swedes transformed the castle from a crusaders' fortress into a ceremonial and administrative centre of political power in Estonia, a purpose the castle has served ever since.

In 1710, Sweden lost the territory of modern-day Estonia to the Russian Empire. Subsequently a number of larger reconstruction schemes were carried out and the building complex was effectively turned from a castle into a palace. A new dominating wing in Baroque and Neoclassical style, designed by Johann Schultz, was added in the eastern part of the complex. It housed the provincial administration of the Governorate of Estonia and the living quarters of the imperial governor. In the 19th century, a public park was also created and to the south-east of the castle, and an archive building erected nearby.

Parliament building

After Estonia became independent in 1918, the government decided to build a new house for the nation's parliament (Riigikogu) at the site of the former convent building of the Teutonic Order. Taking two years to complete, the parliament building, designed by architects Eugen Habermann and Herbert Johanson, was finished in 1922. Although its exterior is traditionalist, the interior is Expressionist in style - the world's only Expressionist parliament building. After 1940, during the period of foreign occupations — by the Soviet Union, by Nazi Germany in 1941—1944, and then again by the Soviet Union after 1944 — the parliament of Estonia was disbanded. The castle and the building of the Riigikogu were however used by the Supreme Soviet of the Estonian SSR (a local rubber stamp Soviet "parliament") in 1944−1990.

Popular culture
According to a legend, recorded in the 19th century, the entire hill of Toompea was once upon a time created by a mythological heroine Linda who built it boulder-by-boulder with her own hands.

See also
History of Estonia
Politics of Estonia
List of castles in Estonia

References

Bibliography

External links

Castles in Estonia
Castles of the Livonian Order
Buildings and structures in Tallinn
Archaeological sites in Estonia
History of Tallinn
Kesklinn, Tallinn
Gothic architecture in Estonia
Government buildings in Estonia
Tourist attractions in Tallinn
Seats of national legislatures
Tallinn Old Town
13th-century architecture in Estonia